Tenma Dam is a gravity dam located in Aomori Prefecture in Japan. The dam is used for flood control and irrigation. The catchment area of the dam is 63.5 km2. The dam impounds about 116  ha of land when full and can store 19584 thousand cubic meters of water. The construction of the dam was started on 1960 and completed in 1970.

References

Dams in Aomori Prefecture
1970 establishments in Japan